The 1938 Bolivian National Convention was a meeting of the unicameral Bolivian legislature composed of an elected constituent assembly made up of the Chamber of Senators and Chamber of Deputies. It met in La Paz from 25 May to 30 October 1938 and was charged with rewriting the Constitution of Bolivia. President David Toro had called for the National Convention in 1937, but by the time it was held he had been forced to resign in a coup d'état which brought the young lieutenant colonel Germán Busch to power on 13 July 1937.

The Congress was elected as part of that year's legislative election. Voter rolls for electing Convention members were opened in August 1937 and the vote was held on 13 March 1938.

Background 
President David Toro, who called the National Convention, had presided over a clearly left-wing ideology known as Military Socialism. His successor Germán Busch, however, was politically enigmatic with both the left and the right alike assuming he would reverse course from the leftist Toro back to the traditional conservatism of the pre-Chaco War establishment.

The coming assembly was the first national legislative body to meet in Bolivia in over three years. With it, the traditional establishment parties (The Liberals and the Genuine and Socialist Republicans) hoped to reassert themselves in national politics. However, the Busch regime soon took a left-wing political stance, implementing the Toro-era concept of union representation in government by allowing the Trade Union Confederation of Bolivian Workers (CSTB) and the Legion of Veterans (LEC) to present candidates in the legislative elections.

Soon, the CSTB and LEC joined with multiple left-wing parties, from the moderate socialist United Socialist Party (PSU) to the more radical Independent Socialist Party (PSI), and formed the Socialist Single Front (FUS), a united electoral alliance backed by the Busch government. Faced with a unified left-wing coalition, the traditional parties withdrew from the elections, save for the Socialist Republicans who joined with the FUS and certain dissident Liberals who chose to collaborate with the new regime.

With the path to victory cleared, the FUS won the 1938 legislative election in a landslide, winning all 18 seats in the Chamber of Senators and 96 of the 103 seats in the Chamber of Deputies with just 7 seats going to independents and 2 being won by independent clerics from La Paz. Thus, when the Convention finally opened in May 1938, the so-called Generación del Chaco (Chaco Generation) finally and for the first time found itself with a national platform from which to constitute its ideas into law.

The Convention 
The National Convention opened on 25 May 1938, electing Renato Riverín of the Popular Front of Potosí (FPP) as its president. It was the first time workers were included in a Bolivian constituent assembly. The Convention dominated the political scene nationwide, becoming the debate grounds of ideologues and thinkers of the entire left-wing spectrum, from moderate socialists to economic nationalists and hard line Marxist labor leaders.

Presidential election 
One of the first acts of the new assembly was to formally elect Germán Busch constitutional president on 27 May. Enrique Baldivieso, a Deputy for Potosí and the leader of the United Socialist Party, was elected Vice President. The pair were formally inaugurated as part of a national holiday the following day with terms set to last until 6 August 1942.

1938 Constitution 
With its dominant position in the assembly, the left-wing quickly overpowered more conservative elements, rejecting liberal concepts of limited government and laissez-faire which had shaped the entire constitutional history of Bolivia. The classical Constitution of 1880 would be thrown out and the new one written under the guidelines of a revolutionary concept known as "social constitutionalism" in which the State was given the expanded role of providing for the economic and social needs of the population. At the same time, the concept of private property was reworded, limiting it from a natural right to a government-given right which was granted only so long as it fulfilled a "social function".

The new constitution also provided for many benefits and securities for organized labor which would now enjoy the direct protection of the State. Annual paid leave, a minimum wage, insurance for accidents and disability, and guarantees for unions were all included. The legal existence of indigenous communities was also recognized.

The so-called "Labor Sector" which represented the most extreme left of the convention also called for full-scale land reform. The leader of the Independent Socialists, the Tarijeño deputy Víctor Paz Estenssoro, also called for complete government control of the country's expansive tin industry, which up until then had been dominated by the tin barons of the mining oligarchy. While these more radical reforms were shot down, they received a voice on the national stage for the very first time.

Finally, after months of deliberation and debate, the Political Constitution of 1938 was promulgated on 30 October.

Aftermath 
For all its successes and contributions, one notable absence from the Convention was President Germán Busch himself. Politically naïve, Busch contributed little to the writing of the new Constitution. The Socialist Single Front, which created a united front of the left-wing parties, only lasted through the legislative elections. From there, the different factions of the left remained in a state of instability, forming and breaking apart from one another in their attempts to create a viable political coalition. Despite attempts by Renato Riverín and Busch's advisor Gabriel Gosálvez to form a government-backed Socialist Party, it suffered from a lack of commitment on the part of Busch and collapsed entirely when Vicente Leyton, his own Minister of Government, refused to join it.

Further fracturing occurred on 19 January 1939 when nine deputies and three senators announced the formation of the Eastern Socialist Party (PSO), also known as the Orientalist Party. The new party was aligned with the traditional liberalism of the pre-Chaco War parties and its political program expressed its intent to "proclaim the intangibility of the Eastern territory" and "to accept as a basic principle the integrity of each of the eastern departments, leaving established their historical and racial identity." For these reasons it was described by its critics as both "regionalist" and "racist" and was condemned by various social and cultural institutions, regional centers, trade union organizations, veterans, journalists, and even the Liberal Party.

Nevertheless, the PSO on 1 February appealed for President Busch to join. However, on 14 February Busch warned that the "founding [of] a regionalist party [...] constitutes an attack against national unity." Busch's harsh condemnation came amidst calls that the members of the PSO be expelled from the legislature. Given the weight of the pressure and "In compliance with the order of His Excellency Mr. President," the PSO was dissolved on 18 February, less than a month after its formation.

The PSO was the last attempt made by the more traditionally-oriented parties to ally themselves with the Busch government. Just a month later on 22 March, the Liberals and both Republican parties broke with their previous policy of interacting with the fringes of the moderate left and formed the Concordance coalition in direct opposition to the government. The Concordance came forth demanding the end of military involvement in government and announced their intent to present candidates for the May legislative elections.

As a result, the left-wing stood without a united front against the resurgent and combined traditional parties, resulting in a bleak outlook on the coming legislative elections. Finally, tired of political manoeuvring and disappointed with the lack of results his regime had produced, Busch took matters into his own hands. On 24 April 1939, Busch declared totalitarian rule in a self-coup to the shock of the nation. The May legislative elections were cancelled and the assembly was permanently adjourned, bringing an end to the only legislature of the military socialist era.

Leadership

National Convention 

 President: Renato Riverín (FPP), from 25 May 1938
First Vice President: Alfredo Mollinedo (PSU)
Secretary: Agustín Landívar Zambrana
Secretary: Augusto Guzmán (PSU)
Secretary: Roberto Jordán Cuéllar (PSU)
Secretary: Jesús Lijerón Rodríguez (Ind.)

Composition

Chamber of Senators 
1938 members of the Chamber of Senators:

Chamber of Deputies 
1938 members of the Chamber of Deputies:

References

Notes

Footnotes

Bibliography 
 
 

Political history of Bolivia
La Paz
1938 in Bolivia
Defunct unicameral legislatures
Constitutional conventions (political meeting)
Constitution of Bolivia
20th century in La Paz